Wife Swap is a British reality television programme produced by independent television production company RDF Media and created by Stephen Lambert for Channel 4, first broadcast in 2003 and ran for 7 years before being cancelled. The show returned for a one-off special episode on 15 June 2017.

In the programme, two families, usually from different social classes and lifestyles, swap wives/mothers  – and sometimes husbands – for two weeks. In fact, the programme will usually deliberately swap wives with dramatically different lifestyles, such as a messy wife swapping with a fastidiously neat one.  Despite using a phrase from the swinging lifestyle, couples participating in the show do not share a bed with the "swapped" spouse while "swapping" homes.

In November 2009, Channel 4 announced that they had cancelled  Wife Swap, and no new episodes of the show would be made for the channel. The final episode was broadcast in December 2009.

It was announced that Wife Swap would return for a special Brexit episode to air on 15 June 2017 on Channel 4.

Synopsis
During the first week, the new wife must adhere to exactly the same rules and lifestyle of the wife she is replacing. Each wife leaves behind a house manual which explains her role in the family and the duties she holds.  This almost always determines what rules the wives will apply at the "rules change ceremony".

During the second week, the new wives are allowed to establish their own rules, and their new families must adhere to these new household rules.  It usually takes a while for the families to adjust to this policy, meanwhile the wives disburse a sum of money to the family they have become involved with, to do what the wives see fit to spend it on.

At the end of the two weeks, the two couples all meet together for the first time, and the wives, along with their husbands, discuss how they felt about the two weeks.  This often descends into personal insults and has degenerated into violence at least twice.  More often than not, however, both families reach toward a middle ground and express that they have learned from the experience. Sometimes, the table meeting is a very heartfelt and emotional time for the two families who sometimes have complete and mutual respect for each other. A few weeks later, the cameras return to record what changes have occurred since the wife swap.

International versions 
{|class="wikitable" style="width: 100%;"
|-
!Country
!Title
!Network
!First airdate
|-bgcolor="lightgreen" 
| 
| Wife Swap Australia
| LifeStyle YouSeven Network
| 9 January 2012
|-
|
|Обмен ЖёнамиObmen Zhjonamy
|ONT 
|24 September 2011
|-
| 
| De Nieuwe Mama
| vtm
| ?
|-
| 
| Troca de Esposas
| RecordTV
| 14 February 2019
|-
| 
| Смени женатаSmeni zhenata
| bTV
| 1 March 2017 
|-
| 
| ¿Quién cambia a quién? Intercambio de Esposas
| Canal 13
| 14 March 2006
|-
| 
| :cs:Výměna manželek
| TV Nova
| 5 September 2005
|-
| 
| Par på prøve| TV3
| 6 October 2003
|-
| 
| :fr:On a échangé nos mamans| M6
| 13 January 2004
|-
| 
| Frauentausch| RTL II
| 14 July 2003
|-
| 
| Maa Exchange| Sony
| January 2011
|-
| 
| :it:Cambio moglie| Fox LifeLA7, SKY VivoNOVE
| 20042005-200820 May 2020
|-
| 
| :he:אמא מחליפה Ima Mahlifah| Channel 2 (Keshet)
| 2005
|-
| 
| :nl:Jouw vrouw, mijn vrouw| RTL4
| ?
|-
|
|Konebytte
|TV3
|22 November 2004
|-
| 
| :pl:Zamieńmy się żonami| TV4
| 2007
|-
| 
| :ro:Schimb de mame| Prima TV
| 2006
|-
| rowspan="2" |
| rowspan="2" |Обмен ЖёнамиObmen Zhjonamy
|STS
|9 July 2011
|-
| Yu TV
| 2017
|-
| 
| Мењам жену Menjam ženu| RTV PinkHappy TV
| July 2006
|-
| 
| Zámena manželiek| TV Markiza
| 6 September 2004
|-
| 
| :es:Me cambio de familia| Cuatro
| 5 February 2010
|-
| 
| :uk:Міняю жінкуMinyayu zhinku| 1+1
| 8 March 2010
|-
| 
| Wife Swap| ABCCMT
| 26 September 2004
|-
|}

 Celebrity Wife Swap 
There have been some celebrity versions of Wife Swap produced:

 Charles Ingram and his wife Diana swapped with Jade Goody of Big Brother and her then-partner Jeff Brazier
 Racing pundit John McCririck and his wife Jenny swapped with politician Edwina Currie and her husband John Jones (known as JJ)
 1980s pop singer and Celebrity Big Brother star Pete Burns and his partner Michael Simpson swapped with former footballer Neil Ruddock and his partner Leah Newman
 Comedian Freddie Starr and his wife Donna swapped with Samantha Fox and her partner Myra Stratton
 1980s pop singer Sinitta and her husband Andy swapped with former Coronation Street star Bruce Jones and his wife Sandra
 Soul singer Alexander O'Neal and his wife Cynthia swapped with wine critic, journalist and television personality Jilly Goolden and her husband Paul
 Rhona Cameron and her partner Suran swapped with fellow comedian Stan Boardman and his wife Viv
 Ron Atkinson and his wife Maggie swapped with Tessa Sanderson and her partner Densign White.

 Boss Swap 
A spin-off, Boss Swap, was broadcast as a series in the UK. A pilot for a US series was shown on ABC but was not commissioned.  Husband Swap and Vacation Swap pilots were also broadcast in America, but were not picked up for series production. In the Netherlands and Belgium Vacation Swap episodes, are produced as "Jouw vakantie, mijn vakantie".

At least once a husband and a live-in boyfriend swapped while the women stayed with their families.

 X-Change 
There is an ongoing series on Hunan Television, in which the people being swapped are mostly the eldest children (or in rare cases, youngest or all children) of between 9–16 years old. One of these comes from an affluent family, but with behavioural and legal issues, in which they must surrender all technological gadgets and money (except for the allowances left by the opposite family, or any money they earned or collected). The other is from a poorer agricultural village, often orphaned or with single parents. This show also has celebrity mentors making videos of support for the participants.

In the Netherlands the same format is being used in KRO's Puberruil, broadcast on NPO3. The children are 15–18 years old. Most of the time Dutch children are swapped, but there are also episodes named "Puberruil buitenland" where Dutch children are swapped with children in countries like India, Brazil and Sierra Leone. Longer episodes are called "Puberruil Xtra".

 In popular culture 
In 2007, Richard Thomas's BBC Two series Kombat Opera Presents included a musical parody of the USA version of Wife Swap, under the title Spouse Change.
In The Vicar of Dibley, Alice Tinker mentions going on the programme.
In 2009 during a week of EastEnders, Max Branning and Tanya Branning swapped lifestyles with Ian Beale and Jane Beale for a week.
The programme was parodied in the children's programme Horrible Histories, where it was called Historical Wife Swap. In the sketch, wives from different positions, such as a Viking and a thrall, or a Pharaoh and a peasant would swap, showing how these people lived. There were seven sketches in total, appearing in series 1–5.

 See also 
 Me cambio de familia (Spanish Version)
 Frauentausch (German version of Wife Swap)
 Holiday Showdown (like Wife Swap, but with holidays)
 Wife Swap - the U.S. series
 X-Change （:zh:變形計） - (Chinese version of Wife Swap, but with children)
 Výměna manželek (Czech version of Wife Swap'')

References

External links 
 Wife Swap UK at Channel4.com
 Boss Swap at Channel4.com
 RDF Media

2000s British reality television series
2010s British reality television series
2003 British television series debuts
2017 British television series endings
Channel 4 original programming
British dating and relationship reality television series
English-language television shows
Television series by Banijay